Ematheudes pseudopunctella is a species of snout moth in the genus Ematheudes. It was described by Ragonot in 1888, and is known from Syria and Turkey.

References

Moths described in 1888
Anerastiini
Insects of Turkey